Kion Wilson (born October 24, 1986) is a former American football linebacker.  He attended the University of South Florida, as a member of the 2010 graduating class. Shortly after the draft ended, Wilson joined the San Diego Chargers of the National Football League as an undrafted free agent. He was born in Jacksonville, Florida and attended William M. Raines High School before playing weak side linebacker at Pearl River Community College in Poplarville, MS. He has received multiple honors for his football career, including 2008 Rookie of the Year and 2009 CollegeFootballPerformance.com co-National Linebacker of the Week versus WVU.

Early years
Wilson attended William M. Raines High School located in Jacksonville, Florida where he was rated as a four-star recruit by Scout.com and a three-star recruit by Rivals.com

Collegiate career
Wilson played weak side linebacker at Pearl River Community College in Poplarville, MS. There he recorded 117 tackles, 2 interceptions and 6 sacks as a freshman. During nine games as a sophomore he recorded 98 tackles, 7 tackles for loss and one sack.

Prior to the Spring 2008 semester Wilson signed with The University of South Florida. He played in 13 games and started in 11.  Wilson ranked 3rd on the team with 66 tackles during his first season as a Bull and also registered 3.5 tackles for loss, one sack, one forced fumble, two fumble recoveries and two pass break-ups. He piled up double-digit tackle numbers against Cincinnati (11), UConn (12) and West Virginia (11)

As a captain during Wilson’s senior year, he played in all 12 games and led the team with 105 tackles, 9 tackles for loss and also had one sack, one force fumble, one fumble recovery, one interception and one pass breakup. Wilson recorded 12 or more tackles in four straight Big East games. With 18 tackles versus Rutgers, the second-most ever in a game in USF history

Honors
 2009 First-team All-Big East selection by the Big East Coaches, ESPN.com, Phil Steele and Rivals.com
 2009 Big East Defensive Player of the Week versus WVU
 2009 CollegeFootballPerformance.com co-National Linebacker of the Week versus WVU
 2009 Defensive Playmaker of the Year by USF coaches
 2009 Defensive MVP by way of unanimous vote from teammates
 2008 Rookie of the Year
 2007 Defensive Player of the Year of the South

Professional career

After going undrafted in the 2010 NFL Draft, Wilson signed with the San Diego Chargers as a rookie free agent on May 10, 2010.  Though he was cut following training camp, he was signed to the team's practice squad, and was eventually promoted to the active roster on October 2 for their Week 4 game.  He played in three games before suffering a season-ending ankle injury and being placed on the Injured Reserve List on October 23, 2010.

On September 3, 2011, the Chargers cut Wilson at the end of training camp.  On October 4, 2011, he was signed by the Carolina Panthers to their practice squad, where he was reunited with his former defensive coordinator from the Chargers, Ron Rivera.

On November 16, 2011 Kion Wilson was added to the Panthers’ active roster from the practice squad, for the final 7 weeks of the 2011 NFL season, playing in 5 games.
Released by the Carolina Panthers on August 31, 2012, Kion Wilson signed a Reserve/Future contract with the Steelers on January 7, 2013.

On December 13, 2013, Wilson was waived by the Steelers. On July 24, 2014, Wilson was waived by the Steelers.

Wilson was signed by the 49ers on August 13, 2014. The 49ers waived Wilson on August 25, 2014.

References

External links

South Florida Bulls football bio
San Diego Chargers bio

1986 births
Living people
William M. Raines High School alumni
Players of American football from Jacksonville, Florida
American football linebackers
South Florida Bulls football players
San Diego Chargers players
Carolina Panthers players
Pittsburgh Steelers players
San Francisco 49ers players